George A. Novacky was an Assistant Department Chair and Senior Lecturer in Computer Science, and an Assistant Dean of CAS for Undergraduate Studies at the University of Pittsburgh.

Education and career
Novacky first received a mathematics degree from Wheeling Jesuit College in 1968.  In 1971, he received his MA in mathematics followed by a PhD in mathematics in 1981.  Both his MA and PhD were from University of Pittsburgh. Novacky's dissertation was Chromaticity of Extremal Graphs.

He was an Associate Professor of Mathematics at the Community College of Allegheny County from 1977 to 1985.

He has been a faculty member of the University of Pittsburgh's Department of Computer Science since 1985. In 1993, Novacky received The Chancellor's Distinguished Teaching Award.

Publications
 Computers and Networks: A Laboratory Approach to Computer Literacy, published by McGraw Hill
 Computer Applications & the Internet, co-author with Y. Khalifa. Published by Pearson, 2003
 PDA Programming in C, co-author with Yasir Khalifa. Published by Kendall Hunt, 2006

References

Year of birth missing (living people)
Living people
University of Pittsburgh faculty
University of Pittsburgh alumni
Wheeling University alumni